Chahak (also Romanized as Chāhak) is a village in, and the capital of, Chahak Rural District of Chahak District of Khatam County, Yazd province, Iran. At the 2006 National Census, its population was 2,587 in 626 households, when it was in the Central District. The following census in 2011 counted 2,910 people in 778 households. The latest census in 2016 showed a population of 2,947 people in 846 households; it was the largest village in its rural district. After the census, the rural district was elevated to the status of a district and divided into two rural districts.

References 

Khatam County

Populated places in Yazd Province

Populated places in Khatam County